The Yoni Chiefdom is a Chiefdom of Sierra Leone located in Tonkolili District, Northern Province, Sierra Leone. It is centred on Yonibana and the Yoni people are part of the Temne ethnic group.

British invasion of 1887
Francis de Winton led the British Yoni Expedition against the Yoni Chiefdom following a number of disputes with the British allies in the area.

References 

Chiefdoms of Sierra Leone
Northern Province, Sierra Leone